TSR may refer to:

Science and technology
 Terminate-and-stay-resident program, a type of MS-DOS computer program
 Thermochemical sulfate reduction, reducing sulfate to sulfide
 Tip-speed ratio, of a wind turbines
 Temporary speed restriction, UK railway term
 Traffic-sign recognition, by equipment in vehicles

Military
 BAC TSR-2, a prototype British bomber
 TSR I and II, prototypes of the Fairey Swordfish torpedo bomber
 FN Tactical Sport Rifle

Arts, media and culture
 TSR, Inc., game publisher
 Télévision Suisse Romande, a French-language Swiss TV channel
 Full Metal Panic! The Second Raid, an anime
 Team Sonic Racing, a video game
 True Symphonic Rockestra, an opera-oriented project
 The Student Room, UK internet forum
 "T.S.R. (Toilet Stool Rap)", song from Biz Markie's album I Need a Haircut

Organizations
 Telford Steam Railway, UK
 Toronto Street Railway (horse-drawn), 1861-1891
 Former Toronto Suburban Railway
 Timișoara Traian Vuia International Airport, Romania, IATA code
 Trans-Siberian Railway
 TSR Records

Other uses
 Travelling stock route, Australia
 Treno Servizio Regionale, Italian trains
 Total shareholder return